Tabrahimt is a village in the Boumerdès Province in Kabylie, Algeria.

Location
The village is surrounded by Meraldene and the town of Thenia in the Khachna mountain range.

Zawiya

 Zawiyet Sidi Boushaki

History
This village has experienced the facts of several historical events:
Expedition of the Col des Beni Aïcha (1837)
Battle of the Col des Beni Aïcha (1871)

Notable people

References

Villages in Algeria
Boumerdès Province
Kabylie